Christopher J. Nassetta (born 1964 in Arlington, Virginia) is an American businessman , who has served as president and chief executive officer of Hilton Worldwide since October 2007. He attended the University of Virginia.In June 2022, Nassetta  was recognized by the International Hospitality Institute  list featuring the 100 Most Powerful People in Global Hospitality.

References 

1964 births
Living people
American businesspeople